Bengt Nilsson (born 4 September 1954) is a Swedish rower. He competed in the men's single sculls event at the 1984 Summer Olympics.

References

External links
 

1954 births
Living people
Swedish male rowers
Olympic rowers of Sweden
Rowers at the 1984 Summer Olympics
People from Landskrona Municipality
Sportspeople from Skåne County